Ralph Emerson (1899–1984) was an American stage and film actor.  He played a mixture of lead and supporting roles during the silent era.

Selected filmography
 The Face on the Bar-Room Floor (1923)
 The Million Dollar Handicap (1925)
 Three Pals (1926)
 The Enemy (1927)
 West Point (1927)
 The Cheer Leader (1928)
 The Albany Night Boat (1928)
 Marriage by Contract (1928)
 Hardboiled Rose (1929)
 Dance Hall (1929)
 Lotus Lady (1930)
 I Believed in You (1934)
 A Night at Earl Carroll's (1940)

References

Bibliography
 Goble, Alan. The Complete Index to Literary Sources in Film. Walter de Gruyter, 1999.
 Vogel, Michelle. Olive Borden: The Life and Films of Hollywood's "Joy Girl". McFarland,  2010.

External links

1899 births
1984 deaths
American male film actors
American male stage actors
People from  Kalispell, Montana